Mario Esteban Berríos Jara (born 20 August 1981) is a Chilean former footballer who played as a defender.

Club career
Born in Santiago, Berríos started out at Palestino and played for the club for several seasons, before moving to Europe. He was signed by Serbia and Montenegro Cup runners-up OFK Beograd in May 2006. Despite featuring in pre-season friendlies, and even scoring goals, Berríos failed to make his official debut for the Serbian club in any competition, including the newly established Serbian SuperLiga and Serbian Cup, as well as the UEFA Cup. He returned to Chile to play for Coquimbo Unido ahead of the 2007 season.

In November 2007, Berríos moved to Asia and signed with Malaysia Super League club Perak. He would also play for Chilean clubs Santiago Morning and Unión La Calera, before retiring in 2017.

International career
At international level, Berríos represented Chile at the 2001 South American U-20 Championship, making six appearances in the tournament. The team finished in fourth place and qualified for the 2001 FIFA World Youth Championship, where Berríos appeared in one game and scored a goal to give his team a 1–0 victory over China. However, Chile exited the tournament in the group stage.

References

External links
 
 
 
 

1981 births
Living people
Footballers from Santiago
Chilean footballers
Association football defenders
Chile under-20 international footballers
Club Deportivo Palestino footballers
OFK Beograd players
Coquimbo Unido footballers
Perak F.C. players
Santiago Morning footballers
Unión La Calera footballers
Chilean Primera División players
Serbian SuperLiga players
Malaysia Super League players
Primera B de Chile players
Chilean expatriate footballers
Chilean expatriate sportspeople in Serbia
Chilean expatriate sportspeople in Malaysia
Expatriate footballers in Serbia
Expatriate footballers in Malaysia